The Port of Gunsan() is a port in South Korea, located in the city of Gunsan, North Jeolla Province.

References

Gunsan